Charles Robert Colvile (30 March 1815 – 8 March 1886) was an English Peelite and Liberal politician who represented the constituency of South Derbyshire.

Colvile was the son of Sir Charles Colvile and his wife Harriet Anne Bonell.

Colvile became MP for Derbyshire South in 1841, supporting Sir Robert Peel and held the seat until 1859. He regained it as a Liberal in 1865 and held it until 1868. He lived at Lullington Hall and was High Sheriff of Derbyshire in 1875.

Colvile married Katherine Sarah Georgina Russell, daughter of John Russell and Sophia Coussmaker. Their son Sir Henry Colvile became a major-general in the 2nd Boer War fighting at the Battle of Modder River.

References

External links 
 

1815 births
1886 deaths
People from South Derbyshire District
Liberal Party (UK) MPs for English constituencies
Members of the Parliament of the United Kingdom for constituencies in Derbyshire
UK MPs 1841–1847
UK MPs 1847–1852
UK MPs 1852–1857
UK MPs 1857–1859
UK MPs 1865–1868
High Sheriffs of Derbyshire